Yepanova is a rural locality (a village) in Beloyevskoye Rural Settlement, Kudymkarsky District, Perm Krai, Russia. The population was 42 as of 2010. There are 4 streets.

Geography 
Yepanova is located 29 km north of Kudymkar (the district's administrative centre) by road. Ilyichi is the nearest rural locality.

References 

Rural localities in Kudymkarsky District